"Flush" is a song by American rock musician Brian "Head" Welch that was released as the first single from his debut album, Save Me from Myself, on July 8, 2008 exclusively on the iTunes Store.

Production
In the digital booklet that came with "Flush", composer Brian Welch commented on the production of the song. The song was "created accidentally" in 2005. Welch had just finished writing the song "Save Me from Myself" and was planning to leave the studio for the night. However, he lost the key to the studio, and decided to remain there while his friend brought the key to him. While Welch was waiting for his friend, he had the thought "I'm gonna go back inside, grab my keyboard, and whatever my hands do, I'll make a song out of it." He immediately started playing the opening riff for "Flush". Welch then recorded the idea. When recording the sound of him puking for the beginning of the song, Welch brought a microphone into the studio bathroom. He then "[made] a huge cup of chunky liquids" and puked into the toilet.

Themes
In the digital booklet that came with "Flush", composer Brian Welch discussed the themes that inspired the song lyrically. He explained that "Flush" is about "flushing all the crap in life down the toilet and starting out fresh." When he wrote the lyrics, he recalled when he was younger. Welch commented, "All the drama that I experienced with getting drunk and doing drugs all the time seemed interesting and amusing to write about. That life style is total insanity and I'm glad to be out of it." He went on to say that the purpose of the song is to inspire alcoholics and drug addicts to "get clean" and that "if I can encourage even one drug addict or alcoholic to get clean with 'Flush,' then the song has served its purpose."

Music video
The music video for "Flush", directed by Frankie Nasso of Nova Entertainment, was released on September 5, 2008. According to a press release about the music video:

The content of the music video has reportedly caused select retailers to pull Save Me from Myself from their shelves. This prompted Welch to provide his explanation of the video:

Reception

Reception for "Flush" has been mostly neutral. Some reviewers found the puking introduction odd, and Allmusic writer William Ruhlmann wrote about it, "... there can't be too many Christian albums which contain songs like "Flush" that begin and end with the sound of someone vomiting into a toilet. But that's the point." Some reviewers even thought the puking introduction was unnecessary, and Christianity Today writer Andrea Goforth commented on it, "... [I] don't think it was really necessary to record the sound of someone vomiting ... to convey the ugliness of drunkenness and addictions ..." Goforth continued to criticize "Flush", comparing it to Korn's 1998 single, "Freak on a Leash", "'Flush' ... just doesn't have quite the same effect as 'Freak on a Leash' did back in 1998."

Some reviewers, however, praised the song. Artistdirect writer Rick Florino said, "... 'Flush' ... touts the line between catchy and epic ... The song itself beckons multiple listens with numerous layers to delve back into on each go around." Despite criticism, Goforth did confess that the song had some good aspects in the interpretation, "... Head's approach to songwriting is honest and unflinching. Rather than take the easy route, he goes in deep for confession." Jesusfreakhideout writer Kevin Hoskins also praised the message of the song, stating, "'Flush' is about trashing all of the garbage in our life. The screaming chants of 'come on, get up, let's change' drive the message home."

Track listing

Compact disc

Digital download

Deluxe digital download

Personnel

 Brian Welch – vocals, lead guitar, producer
 Tony Levin – bass guitar
 Archie J. Muise, Jr. – rhythm guitar
 Josh Freese – drums
 Steve Delaportas – producer

 Ralph Patlan – mixing
 Carlos Castro – audio engineering
 Randy Emata – editing, sound effects
 Alonso Murillo – photography, artwork
 Dave Shirk – mastering

References

2008 singles
Brian Welch songs
Songs about drugs
2008 songs
Songs written by Brian Welch